Paul John Wonner (April 24, 1920April 23, 2008) was an American artist best known for his still-life paintings done in an abstract expressionist style.
Born in Tucson, Arizona, he received a B.A. in 1952, an M.A. in 1953, and an M.L.S. in 1955―all from the University of California, Berkeley.  He rose to prominence in the 1950s as an abstract expressionist associated with the Bay Area Figurative Movement, along with his partner, Theophilus Brown, whom he met in 1952 while attending graduate school. In 1956, Wonner started painting a series of dreamlike male bathers and boys with bouquets.  In 1962, he began teaching at the University of California, Los Angeles.  By the end of the 1960s, he had abandoned his loose figurative style and focused exclusively on still lifes in a hyperrealist style.  Wonner died April 23, 2008, in San Francisco, California.

Permanent collections
Wonner's works are included in the permanent collections of:
the Cantor Arts Center (Stanford University, California),
 the Crocker Art Museum, (Sacramento, California),
the Davis Art Center, (Davis, California),
the Honolulu Museum of Art, 
the Hunter Museum of American Art, (Chattanooga, Tennessee),
the Kemper Museum of Contemporary Art, (Kansas City, Missouri),
the Kresge Art Museum, 
the Madison Museum of Contemporary Art, (Michigan State University, East Lansing, Michigan),
the McNay Art Museum, (San Antonio, Texas), 
the San Francisco Museum of Modern Art, San Francisco, California, 
the Sheldon Museum of Art (Lincoln, Nebraska),
the Smithsonian American Art Museum (Washington, D.C.), 
the Museum of Modern Art, New York, and 
the Solomon R. Guggenheim Museum (New York City).

See also
Bay Area Figurative Movement

References

 Jones, Caroline A., Bay Area Figurative Art 1950-1956, Berkeley, University of California Press, 1990, 93.
 San Francisco Museum of Modern Art, Paul Wonner, Abstract Realist, Los Angeles, Fellows of Contemporary Art, 1981.

External links
 Essay on Paul Wonner
 John Berggruen Gallery

American abstract artists
Abstract painters
Abstract expressionist artists
American Expressionist painters
American Figurative Expressionism
Photorealist artists
1920 births
2008 deaths
American gay artists
Painters from California
San Francisco Art Institute alumni
Artists from Tucson, Arizona
Painters from Arizona
20th-century American painters
20th-century American male artists
American male painters
21st-century American painters
21st-century American male artists
LGBT people from Arizona
20th-century American LGBT people